Tupiza Municipality is the first municipal section of the Sud Chichas Province in the Potosí Department in Bolivia. Its seat is Tupiza which is the capital of the province as well.

Subdivision 
The municipality consists of the following cantons: 
 Chillco 
 Concepcion
 Esmoraca 
 Oploca
 Oro Ingenio
 Quiriza
 Rufino Carrasco
 Soracaya
 Suipacha 
 Talina
 Tupiza 
 Villa Pacheco

The people 
The people are predominantly indigenous citizens of Quechua descent.

References

External links 

Tupiza Municipality: population data and map

Municipalities of Potosí Department